Grab-Its are microwave-safe cookware easily identifiable by their tab handle. They were introduced by Corning Glass Works in 1977, under the Corning Ware brand and are now sold in a slightly different form by Corelle Brands. Grab-Its are notable as being among the first cookware specifically designed for microwave use - their design was recognized by the Smithsonian's Cooper-Hewitt, National Design Museum. Grab-Its strongly resemble porringers.

Grab-Its were made available in two sizes, smaller 15 ounce and larger "Grab-A-Meal" 24 ounce versions. The 15 ounce Grab-Its were available with a plastic cover and/or a Pyrex glass lid. 24 ounce versions came with a glass lid only. In addition to microwave use, Corning Ware and Visions Grab-Its made of Pyroceram are safe on the stovetop, in the oven, and under a broiler (without cover). Newer Corning Ware Grab-Its made of stoneware are safe for microwave and oven use only.

History
Grabits were originally produced and sold by Corning Glass Works, and made from opaque Pyroceram glass-ceramic material.

Corning introduced Grab-Its under the Visions brand in 1988. These were made of transparent Pyroceram (known as Celexium in some regions) with an amber tint. A Cranberry variant was introduced in the early 1990s.

Not long after the Corning Consumer Products Company (now known as Corelle Brands) was spun off in 1998, Pyroceram-based Grabits were discontinued in the USA with the close of the Martinsburg, WV plant in the early 2000s.

The 15 ounce versions were re-introduced in the USA as a stoneware product under the Corning Ware brand a short time later. Amber 15 ounce Visions Grab-Its are still made of transparent Pyroceram in France for sales in select European and Asia-Pacific regions.

Gallery

References

External links
Cookware Information & Guide

Cooking vessels
Cookware and bakeware